Critical Manufacturing is a subsidiary of ASM Pacific Technology Limited (ASMPT). It was founded in 2008 and is focused on providing automation and manufacturing software for high-tech industries, such as photovoltaics, electronics and semiconductors. It has offices in Portugal, USA, Germany and China. In 2018, it became a subsidiary of ASM Pacific Technology Limited.

Products
The company flagship product is Critical Manufacturing MES, a next-generation manufacturing operations management system.

Critical Manufacturing MES uses technologies from Microsoft, providing an Internet application user experience.

References

External links
Official Website
Critical Software

Critical Software
Software companies of Portugal
Industrial automation